The Go Home River is a river in the municipality of Georgian Bay, District Municipality of Muskoka in Central Ontario, Canada. It is part of the Great Lakes Basin and lies in geographic Gibson Township. The river flows west, over a dam, from Go Home Lake to empty into Bushby Inlet, on Georgian Bay, Lake Huron. The settlement of Go Home is located about  further west of the river's mouth.

The river's name comes from the Ojibwa name for this river which means "direct route home".

See also
List of rivers of Ontario

References

Sources

Rivers of Muskoka District
Tributaries of Georgian Bay